Béla Bodó (born 19 January 1959, in Vámospércs) is a retired Hungarian hurdler who specialized in the 110 metres hurdles.

He qualified for the semi-final at the 1983 World Championships, but did not start in that heat. He also competed at the 1979 European Indoor Championships, the 1983 European Indoor Championships and the 1985 European Indoor Championships without reaching the final. He became Hungarian indoor champion in 1979.

The personal best time is 13.68, achieved in July 1983 in Budapest.

References

1967 births
Living people
Hungarian male hurdlers
Sportspeople from Hajdú-Bihar County